Mulberry Fork is a stream in the U.S. state of West Virginia. It is a tributary of Loop Creek.

Mulberry Fork was so named on account of a mulberry tree which stood as a local landmark.

See also
List of rivers of West Virginia

References

Rivers of Fayette County, West Virginia
Rivers of West Virginia